Travers may refer to:

Geography
 Travers, Alberta, Canada, a hamlet
 Travers Reservoir, Alberta, Canada
 Travers River, New Zealand
 Travers, Switzerland, a village in the canton of Neuchâtel
 Travers, Missouri, United States, an unincorporated community

People and fictional characters
 Travers (surname), a list of people and fictional characters

Other uses
 Travers Stakes, a horse race held in Saratoga Springs, New York
 Travers, or haunches-in, a movement in dressage
 Travers SAR antenna, part of the Priroda module of the Russian space station Mir

See also
 Travers Smith, a corporate law firm based in London
 Traverse (disambiguation)

